Lawrence Sherman may refer to:

 Lawrence Yates Sherman (1858–1939), Republican politician from the State of Illinois
 Lawrence W. Sherman (born 1949), experimental criminologist

See also
 Larry Sherman, co-founder of Trax Records
Larry Sherman (actor) (?–2017), American actor